Williamsburg Historic District may refer to:
 Williamsburg Historic District (Williamsburg, Pennsylvania), listed on the NRHP in Blair County, Pennsylvania
 Williamsburg Historic District (Williamsburg, Virginia), listed on the NRHP in Virginia